Beerse is a municipality located in the Belgian province of Antwerp. In 2021, Beerse had a total population of 18,194. The total area is 37.48 km2 (14.5 sq mi). The pharmaceutical company Janssen Pharmaceutica, founded by Dr. Paul Janssen, has its headquarters in Beerse.

Industry
Several companies are located in Beerse, of which the most important are:

 Janssen Pharmaceutica (pharmaceuticals)
 Metallo-Chimique (metallurgy)
 Wienerberger Beerse (bricks)
 Glacio (ice cream)
 Aurora productions (paper and plastics)

Climate

Notable inhabitants

 Peter Evrard, singer
 René Verheyen, soccer player
 Patrick Vervoort, soccer player

References

External links

Age distribution

 
Municipalities of Antwerp Province
Populated places in Antwerp Province